Bieggolmai, Biegolmai, Biegkålmaj, or Bieggålmåj ("the man of the wind") is the unpredictable deity of the summer winds and storms in Sami religious practice.   

He is generally portrayed with two shovels in his hands, which he used to shuffle the winds into and out of his cave.

His winter counterpart is Biegkegaellies.

References

Sámi gods
Wind gods